In biochemistry, the iron-sulfur cluster biosynthesis describes the components and processes involved in the biosynthesis of iron-sulfur proteins.  The topic is of interest because these proteins are pervasive.  The iron sulfur proteins contain iron-sulfur clusters, some with elaborate structures, that feature iron and sulfide centers.  One broad biosynthetic task is producing sulfide (S2-), which requires various families of enzymes.  Another broad task is affixing the sulfide to iron, which is achieved on scaffolds, which are nonfunctional.  Finally these Fe-S cluster is transferred to a target protein, which then become functional.

The formation of iron-sulfur clusters are produced by one of four pathways:
Nitrogen fixation (NIF) system, which is also found in bacteria that are not nitrogen-fixing.
Iron-sulfur cluster (ISC) system, in bacterial and mitochondria
Sulfur assimilation (SUF) system, in plastids and some bacteria

In addition to those three systems, the so-called Cystosolic Iron-Sulfur Assembly (CIA) is invoked for cytosolic and nuclear Fe–S proteins.

Mechanisms

The assembly of iron-sulfur clusters cluster begins with the production of the equivalent of a sulfur (sulfur atoms per se are not found in nature).  The required S atom is obtained from cysteine by the action of so-called cysteine desulfurases.  One prominent desulfurase is called Isc.  Not only is cysteine the source of S,   Furthermore, a cysteine residue is the partner protein IscU plays a role is relaying the S atom to iron.

The enzyme IscS catalyzes the abstraction of a sulfur atom from cysteine. IscS is a pyridoxal phosphate-dependent enzyme.  The sulfur atom becomes inserted into the S-H bond of residue Cys-328 of IscS attacks the sulfur atom of L-cysteine, and the sulfane sulfur derived from L-cysteine binds to the S􏰂 atom of Cys-328, forming a persulfide:
L-cysteine + [enzyme]-cysteine  L-alanine + [enzyme]-S-sulfanylcysteine
The persulfide contains the functional group R-S-S-H, which functions as a source of "inorganic sulfur" that will comprise the Fe-S proteins. Subsequently, the IscS transfers its "extra' sulfur to IscU In addition to IscS and IscU, bacterial Fe-S assembly requires IscA, an 11 kDa protein of uncertain function.

The Suf system for iron-sulfur cluster biosynthesis is generally similar to the Isc system (and the Nif system).  The analogy extends to the existence of SufA, SufS, and SufU.  The Suf system operates with fewer chaparones.

References 

Protein families